"Cape Doctor" is the local name for the strong, often persistent and dry south-easterly wind that blows on the South African coast from spring to late summer (September to March in the southern hemisphere). It is known as the Cape Doctor because of a local belief that it clears Cape Town of pollution and 'pestilence'.

Background
Although the wind blows over a wide area of the Western Cape Province, it is notorious especially in and around the Cape Peninsula, where it can be unpleasantly strong and irritating. Capetonians also call it "the South-Easter".

The South Easter is usually accompanied by fair weather. However, if the South-Easter is accompanied by a cut-off low as occasionally happens in the spring and autumn months, this can cause heavy rains to fall over the Western Cape. This phenomenon is popularly known as a Black South-Easter. The Laingsburg flood of January 1981 was caused by heavy rains as part of a Black South Easter.

It is ironic that the meteorological records for Cape Town show that the north-westerly winds of winter can be far stronger than the South-Easter, while these winds are not given such a positive name. This could be because the north-westerly winds are usually accompanied by rain, which can fall for days and even weeks.

See also 
Fremantle Doctor
Southerly buster
Backdoor cold front

References

External links
Wind Names site

Winds